Daniel Tiago Duarte (born 21 February 1988), simply known as Danielzinho is a Brazilian professional footballer playing for Atlético Cearense as a forward.

On 30 June 2013, Duarte signed for Cypriot club AEL Limassol.

References

External links
 

1988 births
Living people
Association football forwards
Brazilian footballers
Brazilian expatriate footballers
São Bernardo Futebol Clube players
Avaí FC players
Sport Club do Recife players
Associação Desportiva São Caetano players
AEL Limassol players
Campeonato Brasileiro Série A players
Campeonato Brasileiro Série B players
Cypriot First Division players
Expatriate footballers in Cyprus
Footballers from São Paulo